Daniel Luxbacher (born 13 March 1992) is an Austrian professional footballer who plays as an attacking midfielder for First Vienna.

Career statistics

References

Austrian footballers
Austrian Football Bundesliga players
2. Liga (Austria) players
1992 births
Living people
FC Lustenau players
SC Rheindorf Altach players
Association football midfielders